Ernst Hufschmid may refer to:
Ernst Hufschmid (handballer) (1910–?), Swiss field handball player
Ernst Hufschmid (footballer) (1913–2001), Swiss footballer